SC, Sc or sc may refer to:

Arts and media
 Sim City, a city-building simulator game
 Snapchat, a multimedia messaging app
 Social club, a type of club.
 Soulcalibur, fighting video game series created by Namco
 SoundCloud, an online audio distribution platform and music sharing website
 SportsCenter, an American daily sports-news program broadcast on ESPN
 SportsCentre, a Canadian daily sports-news program broadcast on TSN
 Supreme Commander, a real-time strategy video game

Businesses
 SC Paragliding, a defunct Ukrainian aircraft manufacturer
 SCTV (Indonesia) (Surya Citra Television), an Indonesian television network
 Shandong Airlines, IATA airline designation
 Standard Chartered, a multinational bank company headquartered in London England

Education
Scots College, Wellington, New Zealand
 Southland College, Philippines
 St. Christopher's School, Harare, Zimbabwe
 University of South Carolina, Columbia, South Carolina, United States
 South Carolina Gamecocks, the Division I athletic program
 University of Southern California, Los Angeles, California, United States
 Southern California Trojans, the Division I athletic program
Sierra Canyon School, California, United States

Language
 Sc (digraph), a combination of letters used in the spelling of some languages
 "sc.", abbreviation for scilicet, Latin for "it is permitted to know"; See viz.
 Sardinian language, ISO 639 language code
 small caps

Government, law, and military
 SC convoys, a series of Allied convoys that ran during the battle of the Atlantic during World War II
 Scheduled Castes, officially designated groups of historically disadvantaged people in India
 Security Check, a level of security clearance in the United Kingdom
 Post-nominal letters for Senior Counsel, or State Counsel in some countries
 Special constable, auxiliary police constable
 Star of Courage (Australia), an Australian decoration
 Star of Courage (Canada), a Canadian decoration
 Statutes of Canada, a compilation of all the federal laws passed by the Parliament of Canada since Confederation in 1867
 The Supreme Court, the highest court in many legal jurisdictions
United Nations Security Council
Submarine chaser boat
 Sacrosanctum Concilium one of the constitutions of the Second Vatican Council.
 SC radar, an American-made air and surface-search radar used during World War II

Places
 Santa Catarina (state), ISO 3166-2 and Brazilian state abbreviation 
 Saint Kitts and Nevis, NATO country code
 Secunderabad Railway Station, station code, Hyderabad, India
 Seychelles, ISO 3166-1 alpha-2 country code
 Sichuan, Guobiao abbreviation SC, a province of China
 South Carolina, a state in the Eastern US
 Southern California, a US urban area centred on Los Angeles
 State College, a city in Pennsylvania, US

Science and technology

Computing
 .sc, the country code top-level domain (ccTLD) for Seychelles
 SC, a type of optical fiber connector, of a push-pull coupling style
 SC (complexity), a complexity class in computer science, named after Stephen Cook
 sc.exe, a "Service Control" utility for managing Microsoft Windows services
 sc (spreadsheet calculator), a text-based Unix spreadsheet program
 PC/SC, specification for smart-card integration into computers
 Scientific computation, a discipline in computing
 ACM/IEEE Supercomputing Conference, known as SC or Supercomputing Conference

Other uses in science and technology
 Lexus SC, an automobile
 sc (elliptic function), one of Jacobi's elliptic functions
 Scandium, symbol Sc, a chemical element
 Schmidt number (Sc), in fluid dynamics
 × Sophrocattleya (abbreviation Sc), an orchid genus
 Subcutaneous injection or administration, abbreviation
 Superior colliculus, a brain region involved with eye movements
 Clayey sand, in the Unified Soil Classification System
 Sodium cyanide
 Switched capacitor, an electronic circuit element implementing a filter

See also 
 SCC (disambiguation)
 SC2 (disambiguation)
 SCSC (disambiguation)